Leorio or  is a parish of the municipality of Gijón, in Asturias, Spain. Its population was 428 in 2012.

Leorio / Llorio borders the municipality of Siero in the south, with the district of Samartín de Güerces in the east and with the district of Granda in the north.

In this parish is located the Escuela de Fútbol de Mareo, where are the Sporting de Gijón headquarters.

Villages and their neighbourhoods
Llantones
L'Arquera
El Barriu Quemáu
Les Cañes Colgaes
El Cierru
Cuatrovientos
La Fontanica
El Llábanu
Llorio
El Pielgu
El Pozón
La Rambla
El Senderu
La Viseca
Mareo de Baxo
La Belga

External links
 Official Toponyms - Principality of Asturias website.
 Official Toponyms: Laws - BOPA Nº 229 - Martes, 3 de octubre de 2006 & DECRETO 105/2006, de 20 de septiembre, por el que se determinan los topónimos oficiales del concejo de Gijón.

Parishes in Gijón